The Ellerman Baronetcy, of Connaught Square in the Metropolitan Borough of Paddington, was a title in the Baronetage of the United Kingdom. It was created on 11 December 1905 for the shipowner and investor John Ellerman. His only son, the second Baronet, was a natural historian and philanthropist. The title became extinct on the latter's death in 1973.

Annie Winifred Ellerman, better known under the pen name Bryher, daughter of the first Baronet, was a novelist, poet, memoirist, and magazine editor.

Ellerman baronets, Connaught Square (1905)
Sir John Reeves Ellerman, 1st Baronet (1862–1933)
Sir John Reeves Ellerman, 2nd Baronet (1909–1973)

References

Extinct baronetcies in the Baronetage of the United Kingdom